
Gmina Kruszyna is a rural gmina (administrative district) in Częstochowa County, Silesian Voivodeship, in southern Poland.

Villages
Gmina Kruszyna contains the villages and settlements of Baby, Bogusławice, Jacków, Kijów, Kruszyna, Łęg, Lgota Mała, Pieńki Szczepockie, Teklinów, Widzów, Widzówek and Wikłów.

Neighbouring gminas
Gmina Kruszyna is bordered by the gminas of Gidle, Kłomnice, Ładzice, Mykanów, Nowa Brzeźnica and Radomsko.

References

Kruszyna
Częstochowa County